The 2002 FC Spartak Moscow season was the club's 11th season in the Russian Premier League season. Spartak were defending Premier League Champions, having won the previous six titles, but finished the season in third place. In the Russian Cup, Spartak progressed the quarterfinals of the 2002–03 cup, which will take place in the 2003 season. In Europe, Spartak finished bottom of their UEFA Champions League group where they played Valencia, Basel and Liverpool.

Squad

On loan

Left club during season

Transfers

In

Out

Loans out

Released

Competitions

Premier League

Results by round

Results

League table

Russian Cup

2002-03

Quarterfinal took place during the 2003 season.

UEFA Champions League

Group stage

Squad statistics

Appearances and goals

|-
|colspan="14"|Players away from the club on loan:

|-
|colspan="14"|Players who appeared for Spartak Moscow but left during the season:

|}

Goal scorers

Clean sheets 

Levytskyi & Goncharov both played in Spartak's 3-0 victory over Shinnik Yaroslavl on 12 March 2002.

Disciplinary record

References

FC Spartak Moscow seasons
Spartak Moscow